San Lazzaro degli Armeni ("Saint Lazarus of the Armenians"; called Saint Lazarus Island in English sources) is a small island in the Venetian Lagoon which has been home to the monastery of the Mekhitarists, an Armenian Catholic congregation, since 1717. It is one of the two primary centers of the congregation, along with the Mekhitarist Monastery of Vienna.

Settled in the 9th century, it was a leper colony during the Middle Ages, but fell into disuse by the early 18th century. In 1717 San Lazzaro was ceded by the Republic of Venice to Mkhitar Sebastatsi, an Armenian Catholic monk, who established a monastery with his followers. It has since been the headquarters of the Mekhitarists and, as such, one of the world's prominent centers of Armenian culture and Armenian studies. Numerous important publications, such as the first complete dictionary of the Armenian language (1749–69) and the first modern history of Armenia (1781–86), were made in the island by the monks which made it an early major center of Armenian printing.

San Lazzaro has been enlarged nearly four times from its original size through land reclamation. It was recognized as an academy by Napoleon in 1810 when nearly all monasteries of Venice were abolished. A significant episode in its history is Lord Byron's visit in 1816–17. The island is one of the best known historic sites of the Armenian diaspora. The monastery has a large collection of books, journals, artifacts, and the third largest collection of Armenian manuscripts (more than 3,000). Over the centuries, dozens of artists, writers, political and religious leaders have visited the island. It has since become a tourist destination.

Overview

The island is accessible by a vaporetto from the San Zaccaria station (Pier B1). Some 40,000 people visit the island annually, with Italians making up the majority of visitors.

The island's official Italian name, San Lazzaro degli Armeni, literally translates to "Saint Lazarus of the Armenians". It is often referred to in English as Saint Lazarus Island. In Armenian, the island is called Սուրբ Ղազար, Surb Ghazar or Łazar ("Saint Lazarus").

Population
The number of monks, students, and other residents at San Lazzaro has fluctuated throughout history. In 1816, when Byron visited the island, there were some 70 Mekhitarists in San Lazzaro. The number of residents has decreased significantly since. By the early 1840s the island housed 50 monks and students, and some 20 monks in 1960. A Los Angeles Times writer noted in 1998 that San Lazzaro is still a "monastic hub of activity," although at the time the monastery housed only 10 seminarians and 10 fathers. Teresa Levonian Cole wrote in The Independent that, as of 2015, 12 vardapets (educated monks) and five novices reside in San Lazzaro.

History

Middle Ages
The recorded history of the island begins in the 9th century. In 810, the Republic of Venice allocated the island to the abbot of the Benedictine Monastery of St. Ilario of Fusina. Leone Paolini, a local nobleman, obtained the island as a gift from the Abbot Uberto di Sant'Ilario and built a church, initially dedicated to Pope Leo I. It soon became an asylum for those infected with leprosy. In the 12th century, leprosy had appeared in Venice as a result of trade with the East. Paolini transferred the simple hospital of San Trovaso to the island. Thus, a leper colony was established at the island, which was chosen for that purpose due to its relative distance from the principal islands forming the city of Venice. It received its name from St. Lazarus, the patron saint of lepers. The church of San Lazzaro was founded in 1348, which is attested by an inscription in Gothic script. In the same year, the hospital was renovated and its ownership transferred from the Benedictines to the patriarchal cathedral of San Pietro. Leprosy declined by the mid-1500s and the island was abandoned by 1601 when only the chaplain and some gardeners remained at the island to grow vegetables. In the second half of the 17th century the island was leased to various religious groups. In 1651 a Dominican order settled at the island after fleeing from Turkish-occupied Crete. Jesuits also briefly settled there. By the early 18th century only a few crumbling ruins remained.

Armenian period

Establishment
In April 1715, a group of twelve Armenian Catholic monks led by Mkhitar Sebastatsi (English: Mekhitar of Sebaste, Italian: Mechitar) arrived in Venice from Morea (the Peloponnese), following its invasion by the Ottoman Empire. The monks were members of a Catholic order founded by Mkhitar in 1701, in Constantinople, the capital of the Ottoman Empire. The order moved to Modone (Methoni), on the southern shore of the Peloponnese, in 1703, after repressions by the Ottoman government and the Armenian Apostolic Church. In 1712 the order received recognition by Pope Clement XI. Victor Langlois wrote that a Venetian admiral and the Venetian governor of Morea, "sympathizing deeply with the fearful distress of the unfortunate community, yielded to their earnest entreaties for permission to embark on a government vessel which was about to leave for Venice."

On September 8, 1717, on the Feast of the Nativity of Mary,  the Venetian Senate ceded San Lazzaro to Mkhitar and his companions, who agreed not to rename the island. He was reminded of the monastery on the island of Lake Sevan, where he had sought education earlier in his life. Upon acquisition, the monks began works of restoration of existing buildings on the island. The entire community then relocated to the island in April 1718 when the buildings on San Lazzaro became habitable. Mkhitar himself designed the plan of the monastery, which was completed by 1840. The monastery originally included 16 cells for monks, which were adjusted from the old hospital. The church's restoration lasted from May to November 1722. Mkhitar died in 1749. The bell tower was completed a year later, in 1750.

Later history
The Venetian Republic was disestablished by Napoleon in 1797. In 1810, he abolished all monastic orders of Venice and the Kingdom of Italy, except that of the Mekhitarists in San Lazzaro. The Mekhitarist congregation was left in peace, according to some sources, due to the intercession of Roustam Raza, Napoleon's Mamluk bodyguard of Armenian origin. Napoleon signed a decree, dated August 27, 1810, which declared that the congregation may continue to exist as an academy. Since then, San Lazzaro has also known as an academy and sometimes referred to in Latin as Academia Armena Sancti Lazari.

The monastery has been enlarged significantly through land reclamation four time since the 19th century. First, in 1815, the Mekhitarists were permitted by Austrian Emperor Francis I to expand the island. The area north of the island was filled which doubled its area from 7,900m² to 13,700 m2. In 1836, a boundary wall around the island's newly reclaimed area was built. The channel of the boathouse was filled in 1912 and it was moved to the far western corner. The shoreline was straightened. These adjustments increased its area to 16,970 m2. San Lazzaro's latest major enlargement occurred in post-World War II period. Between 1947 and 1949, the island was expanded on the southeast and the southwest. The island now has an area of 30,000 m2 or 3 hectares.

20th century and beyond
The island was heavily affected by the unprecedented acqua alta of November 4, 1966. The flooded sea water entered the main church and flooded the enclosed garden for around 12 hours. The library and the manuscript depository were not affected by the flood and none of the churchmen suffered injuries. A fire broke out on the night of December 8, 1975, which partially destroyed the library and damaged the southern side of the church, and destroyed two Gaspare Diziani paintings.

Between 2002 and 2004, an extensive restoration of the monastery's structures was carried out by the Magistrato alle acque under the coordination of Consorzio Venezia Nuova, an agency of the Italian Ministry of Infrastructure and Transport. It included restoration of the island's shores and its walls and the boathouse.

San Lazzaro hosted the pavilion of Armenia during the 56th Venice Biennale in 2015. The exhibition, dedicated to the 100th anniversary of the Armenian Genocide and curated by Adelina Cüberyan von Furstenberg, won the Golden Lion award in the national participation category.

San Lazzaro was affected by the November 13, 2019 flood, the heaviest since 1966.

Monastery

San Lazzaro is entirely occupied by the Mekhitarist monastery of San Lazzaro, which is the headquarters of the Armenian Catholic Mekhitarist Congregation. The monastery is known in Armenian as Մխիթարեան Մայրավանք, M(ə)khitarian Mayravank''', which literally translates to the "Mekhitarist Mother Monastery" and in Italian as Monastero Mechitarista. The monastery currently contains a church with a bell tower, residential quarters, library, museums, picture gallery, manuscript repository, printing plant, sundry teaching and research facilities, gardens, a bronze statue of Mkhitar erected by Antonio Baggio in 1962, an Armenian genocide memorial erected in the 1960s, and a 14th-century basalt khachkar (cross stone) donated by the Soviet Armenian government in 1987.

The cloister of the monastery consists of a colonnade of 42 columns in the Doric order. There is a 15th-century water well in the center of the cloister, which is surrounded by trees and shrubs. A Phoenician and early Christian inscriptions, a first century headless statue of a Roman noble from Aquileia and other artifacts were found there.

The bell tower with an onion dome was completed in 1750. It is not attached to the church and stands alone near the northern side of the church.

The church

The church of San Lazzaro, although renovated several times through centuries, retains the 14th century pointed arch style. The church was restored extensively by Mkhitar in 1722, five years after the settlement of Armenian monks. He completely rebuilt the altar. Its apse was extended in 1899 primarily with an addition of neo-Gothic elements. The church has a neo-Gothic interior. It is three-naved, supported by 6 red marble columns. The main altar is in Baroque style. The three main windows of the altar's apse have stained glass which depict from left to right: Sahak Patriarch, Saint Lazarus, and Mesrop Mashtots. In the church, there are frescoes and paintings by Antonio Ermolao Paoletti depicting Saint Peter, Saint Paul, John the Baptist and Saint Stephen. The tomb of Mkhitar is located in the front of the altar.

Besides the main altar, there are four other altars dedicated to the Holy Cross, St. Gregory the Illuminator, Mary, and Anthony the Great. All built in the period of 1735–38 by Mkhitar. They are all adorned by pieces of works, mainly by Venetian artists. The St. Gregory altarpiece by Noè Bordignon depicts the saint performing the baptism of the Armenian king Tiridates III. The altarpiece dedicated to the mother of Jesus depicts the Nativity of Mary by Domenico Maggiotto. The altarpiece of St. Anthony by Francesco Zugno depicts the founder of the Oriental monasticism who inspired Mkhitar.

Paintings 
Within the church, there are paintings of Armenian saints by Paoletti created in 1901: Ghevond, Hripsime, Nerses of Lambron, Nerses the Great, Sandukht, Vardan, Gregory of Narek, Nerses Shnorhali. Other significant paintings include Madonna with Child by Palma il Giovane (Jacopo Negretti), the baptism of king Tiridates III by St. Gregory the Illuminator by Hovhannes Patkerahan (1720), Assumption of Mary by Jacopo Bassano, Annunciation and Mother of Mercy by Matteo Cesa, the Flood by Leandro Bassano, Flight into Egypt by Marco Basaiti, Annunciation by Bernardo Strozzi, St. Thecla and Sts. Peter and Paul by Girolamo da Santacroce, Moses Saved from the Waters and Archangel Raphael by Luca Carlevarijs.

Gardens
The gardens of the monastery have been admired by many visitors. "The island ... with its flower and fruit gardens, is so well kept that an excursion to San Lazzaro is a favourite one with all visitors to Venice," noted one visitor in 1905.  Irish botanist Edith Blake wrote: "The garden in the centre of the cloisters was gay with flowers, and there was a calm, peaceful air of repose over the whole place."

The monks at San Lazzaro make jam from the roses grown in the gardens. The jam, called Vartanush, is made from rose petal around May, when the roses are in full bloom. Besides rose petal, it contains white caster sugar, water, and lemon juice. Around five thousand jars of jam are made and sold in the gift shop in the island. Monks also eat it for breakfast.

Collections
Library

The library contains 150,000 to 200,000 printed books in Armenian, as well as European and Oriental languages. Some 30,000 European books printed before 1800 are kept at the library. The entire collection includes books on the arts, the sciences, history, natural history, diverse classical texts, literary criticism, major encyclopedias and other reference books.

The floor of the library is decorated in a Venetian style. Its ceiling, partially destroyed in the 1975 fire, was painted by Francesco Zugno and depicts Catherine of Alexandria, the four fathers of the Latin Church (Ambrose, Augustine, Jerome, St. Gregory the Great), and fathers of the Armenian Church. A chalk sculpture of Napoleon II by Antonio Canova is preserved in a glass cabinet in the library. A sculpture of Pope Gregory XVI by Giuseppe De Fabris, presented to the Mekhitarists by the Pope himself, is also kept at the room.

In 2021 the Aurora Humanitarian Initiative donated $50,000 to support the library in memory of Vartan Gregorian.

Manuscripts

The Mekhitarists regard the collection of manuscripts the greatest treasure of San Lazzaro. During the 19th century, Mekhitarist monks extracted from these manuscripts and published some previously unpublished pieces of Armenian and non-Armenian literature. According to the magazine of the Church of England, by 1870, San Lazzaro had the second largest collection of Armenian manuscripts after Etchmiadzin having some 1,200 manuscripts in possession. The exact current number of manuscripts preserved at San Lazzaro is unknown. According to Bernard Coulie the number is around 3,000, which comprises some 10% of all extant Armenian manuscripts. According to the Mekhitarist Congregation website the monastery contains 4,500 Armenian manuscripts. Armenian Weekly writer Levon Saryan noted that the manuscript collection of San Lazzaro consists of over 3,000 complete volumes and about 2,000 fragments. San Lazzaro is usually ranked as the third largest collection of Armenian manuscripts in the world after the Matenadaran in Yerevan, Armenia and the Armenian Patriarchate of Jerusalem. The manuscript collection is kept in the rotunda-shaped tower, called the Manuscript Room (manuscript repository). Its construction was funded by Cairo-based Armenian antiques dealer Boghos Ispenian and was designed by his son Andon Ispenian. It was inaugurated in 1970 in attendance of Catholicos Vasken I.

The earliest manuscripts preserved at the repository date to the eighth century. Among its notable manuscripts are the 9th century Gospel of Queen Mlke (Մլքե թագուհու Ավետարան), the early 11th century Adrianopolis Gospel; the Life of Alexander the Great, an Armenian translation of a 5th-century Greek version by Pseudo-Callistene; the Gospels of Gladzor (dated 1307). In 1976–79 some 300 manuscripts were donated by Harutiun Kurdian, for which new display cases were added. It holds one of the ten extant copies of Urbatagirk, the first-ever Armenian book printed by Hakob Meghapart in Venice in 1512. Furthermore, 44 Armenian prayer scrolls (hmayil) are preserved at the repository.

Armenian museum
 
The Armenian museum was designed by Venetian architect Giovanni Rossi and completed in 1867. Seriously damaged by a 1975 fire, it was restored in its present from by Manouk Manoukian. It formerly served as the library of Armenian manuscripts and publications. The museum now houses items related to Armenian history and art, inducing helmets and bronze belts from the Urartian period; the sword of Leo V, the last Armenian King of Cilicia, forged in Sis in 1366; Armenian ceramics from Kütahya; coins, stamps and a passport issued by the 1918–20 First Republic of Armenia. Numerous Armenian religious objects of art from the 16th to 18th centuries are on display. A bas-relief in agate from the medieval Armenian capital of Ani and a curtain formerly hang at the monastery of Lim Island on Lake Van are also on display, along with several paintings by Russian-Armenian marine artist Ivan Aivazovsky, including depictions of Mount Ararat and Niagara Falls. His Biblical creation-themed painting Chaos (1841) was donated to the congregation by Pope Leo XIII in 1901. The death mask of Komitas, the musicologist who established the Armenian national school of music, is also on display in the museum. Also on display is one of the most ancient swords ever found, originating from Anatolia and dating to the 3rd millennium BC.

Oriental museum

Oriental and Egyptian publications and artifacts are held in what is called the "Lord Byron Room", because it is where he studied Armenian language and culture during his visit to San Lazzaro. It was originally the manuscript room. Its most notable item is the Egyptian mummy, sent to San Lazzaro in 1825 by Boghos Bey Yusufian, an Egyptian minister of Armenian origin. It is attributed to Namenkhet Amun, a priest at the Amon Temple in Karnak, and has been radiocarbon dated to 450–430 BC (late period of ancient Egypt). The collection also includes  Etruscan vases, Chinese antiques, a princely Indian throne with ivory inlay work, and a rare papyrus in 12 segments in Pali of a Buddhist ritual, with bustrophedic writing in red lacquer on gold leaf brought from Madras by a Russian-Armenian archaeologist, who discovered it in a temple in 1830.

Paintings
Among the art works on display at the monastery corridors are charcoal drawings by Edgar Chahine, landscapes by Martiros Saryan, Mount Ararat by Gevorg Bashinjaghian, a marine painting by Charles Garabed Atamian and a collage by Sergei Parajanov, a triptych by Francesco Zugno depicting the baptism of King Tiridates III by Gregory the Illuminator, various paintings by Luigi Querena, Binding of Isaac by Francesco Hayez, and others.

Publishing house 
A publishing house was established at the island in 1789. It was closed down in 1991, however, the Mekhitarists of San Lazzaro continue publication through their publishing house, Casa Editrice Armena. Until the early 20th century, a number of important publications were made on the island. Khachig Tölölyan wrote of the role the Mekhitarists and their publications:
 
The publications of the Mekhitarists, both in San Lazzaro and Vienna, contributed greatly to the refinement of literary Western Armenian. The San Lazzaro branch became particularly noted in the fields of history, the arts, and literature influenced by the Italian penchant for the arts. The publishing house printed books in dozens of languages, which included themes such as theology, history, linguistics, literature, natural sciences, and economics. They also published textbooks and translations from European languages and editions of classics.

Significant publications 

Among its publications, the most significant work is the two-volume dictionary of Classical Armenian: Բառգիրք Հայկազեան Լեզուի Baṛgirkʻ haykazean lezui (Dictionary of the Armenian Language, 1749–69), which made Armenian the sixth language (after Latin, Greek, French, Italian, and Spanish) to have such a complete dictionary. Its expanded and improved edition, Նոր Բառգիրք Հայկազեան Լեզուի, Nor baṛgirkʻ haykazean lezui (New Dictionary of the Armenian Language, 1836–37), is considered a monumental achievement and remains unsurpassed. Mikayel Chamchian published the first modern history of Armenia in three volumes (1781–86). Ronald Grigor Suny argues that these publications laid the foundations for the emergence of secular Armenian nationalism. Beginning in 1800 a periodical journal has been published at the island. Bazmavep, a literary, historical and scientific journal, was established in 1843 and continues to be published to this day.

Role in Armenian history

San Lazzaro has a great historical significance to Armenians and has been described as a "little Armenia." The New York Times wrote in 1919: "The island of San Lazzaro, near Venice, has been for over two centuries an Armenian oasis transplanted in the Venetian lagoons." It is one of the richest Armenian enclaves, and, according to sociologist Anny  Bakalian, one of the best-known Armenian sites in the world, along with the Armenian Quarter of Jerusalem's Old City. William Dean Howells noted in 1866 that "As a seat of learning, San Lazzaro is famed throughout the Armenian world." The Oxford Dictionary of the Christian Church calls the convent of San Lazzaro and the order of the Mechitarists "especially remarkable" of the religious orders based in Venice. American Protestant missionary Eli Smith noted in 1833 that the convent of San Lazzaro not only did not pursue the "denationalizing system of many of the Romish missions among the oriental churches," but also has done "more than all other Armenians together, to cultivate and enrich the literature of the nation." Travel writer Louisa Stuart Costello called the Armenian convent of San Lazzaro "a respectable pile, above the encircling waters, an enduring monument of successful perseverance in a good cause."

Cultural awakening 
According to Robert H. Hewsen for nearly a century—until the establishment of the Lazarev Institute in Moscow in 1815—the monastery of San Lazzaro was the only center of intensive Armenian cultural activity that held the heritage of the Armenian people. During the 18th century, the rediscovery of classical Armenian literature and the creation of an Armenian vernacular by the Mechitarists of San Lazzaro was a key factor in the "Armenian Renaissance." Italian scholar Matteo Miele compared the work of the Mekhitarists carried out in the island to the work of the humanists, painters and sculptors of the Italian Renaissance. For over a century the monastery of San Lazzaro became the "potent agency for the advancement of secular, as well as of religious, knowledge" with "avowed religious, educational, and literary objectives like those of the medieval Benedictine order."

National consciousness and nationalism 
The activities of the island monastery, which became a center for Armenian studies, led to a revival of Armenian national consciousness. According to Harry Jewell Sarkiss the emphasis Mekhitarists of San Lazzaro put on "their national history and language was significant, for thereby they planted the seeds" of modern Armenian nationalism. Elizabeth Redgate writes that the developments in intellectual culture and scholarship in Russian Armenia and at the Mkhitarist monasteries of San Lazzaro and Vienna inspired an increased nationalism among Armenians in the 1880s. Mary Tarzian suggests that nationalism among Armenians in the Ottoman Empire emerged from the educational vision of the Mechitarists in San Lazzaro. This view was expressed as early as 1877 when Charles Yriarte wrote that the Armenians "look with justice upon the island of San Lazzaro as the torch which shall one day illuminate Armenia, when the hour comes for her to live again in history and to take her place once more among free nations."

However, their activities were not without criticism. Mikael Nalbandian, a liberal and anti-clerical Russian-Armenian writer, wrote in the mid-19th century that the "enlightenment of our nation must proceed from the hands of execrable papist monks! Their 'light' is far more pernicious than darkness."

Notable resident scholars

Notable visitors
A wide range of notable individuals have visited the island through centuries.

Lord Byron

English Romantic poet Lord Byron visited the island from November 1816 to February 1817. He acquired enough Armenian to translate passages from Classical Armenian into English. He co-authored English Grammar and Armenian in 1817, and Armenian Grammar and English in 1819, where he included quotations from classical and modern Armenian. The room where Byron studied now bears his name and is cherished by the monks. There is also a plaque commemorating Byron's stay. Byron is considered the most prominent of all visitors of the island. James Morris wrote in 1960 that "many people in Venice, asked to think of San Lazzaro, think first of Byron, and only secondly of the Armenians. Byron's spirit haunts the island."

Non-Armenians
Pope Pius VII visited the island on May 9, 1800. Since the 19th century numerous notable individuals visited San Lazzaro, such as composers Jacques Offenbach, Gioachino Rossini, Pyotr Ilyich Tchaikovsky, and Richard Wagner (1859), writers Alfred de Musset and George Sand (1834), Marcel Proust (1900), Ivan Turgenev, Nikolai Gogol, Henry Wadsworth Longfellow, British art critic John Ruskin (early 1850s), and French historian Ernest Renan (1850).

During the 19th century numerous monarchs visited the island, including Charles IV of Spain, Franz Joseph I of Austria, Umberto I of Italy, Charles I of Romania, Emma of Waldeck and Pyrmont, Wilhelmina of the Netherlands, Prince Napoléon Bonaparte, Ludwig I of Bavaria, (1841), Margherita of Savoy, Maximilian I of Mexico, Carlota of Mexico, Edward VII, Prince of Wales and future British king (1861), Napoleon III (1862), Pedro II of Brazil (1871), Princess Louise, Duchess of Argyll (1881), Alexander I of Russia. U.S. President Ulysses S. Grant and British Prime Minister William Gladstone visited San Lazzaro in 1878 and 1879, respectively.

A legend claims that future Soviet leader Joseph Stalin, a Bolshevik revolutionary at the time, worked as a bell-ringer at the monastery of San Lazzaro in 1907. However, there is no evidence that Stalin ever visited the island.

Armenians
Russian-Armenian marine painter Ivan Aivazovsky visited San Lazzaro in 1840. He met his older brother, Gabriel, who was working at the monastery at that time. At the monastery library and the art gallery Aivazovsky familiarized himself with Armenian manuscripts and Armenian art in general. Another Armenian painter, Vardges Sureniants, visited San Lazzaro in 1881 and researched Armenian miniatures. Ethnographer Yervand Lalayan worked at the island for around six months in 1894. Musicologist Komitas lectured on Armenian folk and sacred music and researched the Armenian music notation (khaz) system in the monastery library in July 1907. The first meeting of poets Yeghishe Charents and Avetik Isahakyan took place in San Lazzaro in 1924. Soviet Armenian composer Aram Khachaturian visited it in 1963, and Soviet Armenian astrophysicist Victor Ambartsumian in 1969.

At least two catholicoi (leaders) of the Armenian Apostolic Church—which was historically a rival of the Armenian Catholic Church, which the Mekhitarists are a part of—have visited the island: Vazgen I (in 1958 and 1970) and Karekin II (in 2008).

Since independence in 1991 at least three presidents of Armenia—Robert Kocharyan in 2005, Serzh Sargsyan in 2011, and Armen Sarkissian (with his wife Nouneh Sarkissian) in 2019—visited San Lazzaro. Prime Minister Nikol Pashinyan also visited San Lazzaro in 2019.

Henrikh Mkhitaryan, an Armenia international football player, married Betty Vardanyan at the monastery of San Lazzaro on June 17, 2019.

Artistic depictions
Numerous artists have painted the island, including Vignette of the Isola di S. Lazzaro degli Armeni by Antonio Visentini (d. 1782, undated), Royal Collection, Windsor Castle Island of Surb Ghazar at night by Gevorg Bashinjaghian (1892), National Gallery of Armenia Byron's visit to the Mekhitarists in Surb Ghazar Island by Ivan Aivazovsky (1899), National Gallery of Armenia The Armenian Convent by Joseph Pennell (1905), Library of Congress Prints and Photographs Division Sb. Ghazar island, Venice by Hovhannes Zardaryan (1958), National Gallery of Armenia

See also
Mekhitarist Monastery, Vienna
Armenians in Italy
List of Armenian ethnic enclaves
Santa Croce degli Armeni
Armenian Catholic Church

References
Notes

Citations

Bibliography
Books on San Lazzaro
Peratoner, Alberto (2007; 2015). From Ararat to San Lazzaro. A Cradle of Armenian Spirituality and Culture in the Venice Lagoon. -'' Contributions by Fr. Vertanes Oulouhodjan and H.E. Boghos Levon Zekiyan. Venice: Congregazione Armena Mechitarista - Casa Editrice Armena.

Articles on San Lazzaro
 
 Alt URL
 web version

 

 Part I, Part II, Part III

Other books

Other articles

Further reading

External links

Armenian culture
Islands of the Venetian Lagoon
Christian monasteries established in the 18th century
Mekhitarist Order
Libraries in Venice
Armenian Catholic Church in Italy
18th-century architecture in Italy